David Darlow (born 25 December 1943 in Jerusalem) is an American actor and stage director.

Life 
David Darlow was born in 1943 in Jerusalem. He grew up in Tel Aviv in his first years. Later he moved to the United States.

Darlow started his career at the theatre. In 1974 he directed the Off-Broadway play Demons: A Possession for the New York Playwrights Horizons. He predominantly was active as an actor and director in Chicago theatres such as the Goodman Theatre, the Chicago Shakespeare Theater under Remy Bumppo Theatre Company. He was nominated multiple times for the Jeff Award, as an actor as well as a director. In 2001 he won the award in the category Actor in a Supporting Role – Play for his role in Endgame. Darlow also was artistic director of the Oak Park Festival Theatre.

Since the mid 1970s Darlow also appeared in film and TV productions. He had minor roles in TV series such as Barney Miller, Barnaby Jones, Dallas, Buck Rogers in the 25th Century or Simon & Simon. Later he also appeared in feature films such as Miller's Crossing, The Fugitive, Road to Perdition, The Weather Man, Let's Go to Prison and No God, No Master.

Darlow was married to playwright and actress Kristine Thatcher from 1991 until 2003; in 1991 the couple adopted a daughter. Since 2006 he is married to Rachel Silverman Darlow.

Selected filmography 
Actor

Selected theatrography  
Actor

Director

Awards and nominations 
 1985: Nomination for the Jeff Award in the category Actor in a Principal Role – Play for his role in The Philanthropist at Court Theatre
 1986: Nomination for the Jeff Award in the category Actor in a Principal Role – Play for his role in The Real Thing at Northlight Theatre
 2001: Winner of the Jeff Award as Actor in a Supporting Role – Play for his role in Endgame with the American Theater Company
 2006: Nomination for the Jeff Award in the category Actor in a Principal Role – Play for his role in Power with the Remy Bumppo Theatre Company
 2017: Nomination for the Jeff Award in the category Director – Play für seine Inszenierung von Born Yesterday with the Remy Bumppo Theatre Company 
 2019: Nomination for the Jeff Award in the category Performer in a Principal Role – Play for his role as André in The Father

References

External links 
 
 
 David Darlow at abouttheartists.com

1943 births
Living people
American male film actors
American male stage actors
American theatre directors